Mathieu Loicq (born 27 June 1979) is a former Belgian para table tennis player who is a double Paralympic champion, double European champion and a multi-medalist in the world championships, he was born with a deformed left hand and is a right handed player. He was world number one in 2006 and 2009 and retired in 2018.

References

1979 births
Living people
Belgian male table tennis players
Table tennis players at the 2004 Summer Paralympics
Table tennis players at the 2008 Summer Paralympics
Table tennis players at the 2012 Summer Paralympics
Table tennis players at the 2016 Summer Paralympics
Medalists at the 2004 Summer Paralympics
Paralympic medalists in table tennis
Paralympic gold medalists for Belgium
Paralympic table tennis players of Belgium
People from Mouscron
Sportspeople from Hainaut (province)